Hockley-in-the-Hole was an area of Clerkenwell Green in central London where bull-baiting, bear-baiting and similar activities occurred in the 17th and 18th centuries. The Beargarden was located at Hockley-in-the-Hole where the Coach & Horses pub at Back Hill and Ray Street meet today, north of the junction of Clerkenwell Road and Farringdon Road.

See also
 Beargarden
 Westminster Pit

References

Animal cruelty incidents
Baiting (blood sport)
Clerkenwell
Sports venues in London